Pterolophia leucoloma is a species of beetle in the family Cerambycidae. It was described by Castelnau in 1840.

References

leucoloma
Beetles described in 1840